Khaira was a town and Village Development Committee  in Pyuthan District in the Rapti Zone of central south-western Nepal. At the time of the 1991 Nepal census it had a population of 4,217 persons residing in 769 individual households.

References

External links
UN map of the municipalities of Pyuthan District

Populated places in Pyuthan District
Village development committees (Nepal)